Edward 'Eddie' Thomas Niels Pollock (born 1 June 1957) is a Scottish former cricketer and educator.

Pollock was born at Stirling in June 1957 and was educated in the town at St Modan's High School. A club cricketer for Stenhousemuir Cricket Club, Pollock made a single appearance for Scotland in a List A one-day match against Northamptonshire at Northampton in the 1983 Benson & Hedges Cup. He was dismissed for 6 runs in the match by Tim Lamb. By profession, Pollock was a physical education teacher at Dollar Academy.

References

External links
 

1957 births
Living people
Cricketers from Stirling
People educated at St Modan's High School
Scottish cricketers
Scottish schoolteachers